"Inútil Paisagem" ("Useless Landscape") is a song composed by Antônio Carlos Jobim, with lyrics by Aloysio de Oliveira. An English-language version with lyrics by Ray Gilbert is titled "If You Never Come to Me".

Notable recordings
with Antônio Carlos Jobim
1964: Dorival Caymmi & Tom Jobim – Caymmi Visita Tom e Leva Seus Filhos Nana, Dori & Danilo (Elenco), also released as single B-side of "... Das Rosas"
1964: Sergio Mendes Trio featuring Antonio Carlos Jobim and Art Farmer – Bossa Nova York (Elenco)
1965: The Wonderful World of Antonio Carlos Jobim (Elenco/Warner Bros.)
1967: Frank Sinatra and Jobim - Francis Albert Sinatra & Antonio Carlos Jobim (Reprise)
1967: Antônio Carlos Jobim & Sérgio Mendes - Antonio Carlos Jobim & Sérgio Mendes (Elenco)
1974: Elis Regina and Jobim - Elis & Tom (Philips)
1987: Inédito (Ariola)

Others
1964: Conjunto Som 4 (Hermeto Pascoal a.o.) on their album Conjunto Som 4 (Continental/Warner)
1964: Eumir Deodato - Inútil Paisagem - As Maiores Composições de Antonio Carlos Jobim
1964: Morgana King - It's a Quiet Thing
1964: Os Cariocas -  A Grande Bossa dos Cariocas
1964: Cauby Peixoto – "Balançafro" single B-side
1964: Wanda Sá - Wanda Vagamente
1964: Wilson Simonal – A Nova Dimensão do Samba (Odeon)
1964: Walter Wanderley - O Toque Inconfundível de Walter Wanderley
1964: Paul Winter, w/ Luiz Bonfa, Roberto Menescal & Luiz Eça – Rio (Columbia)
1964: Zimbo Trio - Zimbo Trio (RGE)
1965: Milton Banana Trio (with Walter Wanderley) - Milton Banana Trio (Odeon)
1966: Sylvia Telles - The Music of Mr. Jobim
1966: Quarteto em Cy - Quarteto em Cy (Elenco)
1967: Dick Farney - Dick Farney, piano e Orquestra Gaya, and Dick Farney (1975)
1969: Ella Fitzgerald - Sunshine of Your Love, and Ella Abraça Jobim (1981)
1988: Nana Caymmi – Nana (EMI)
1991: Azymuth – Tudo Bem (Intima)
1995: Javon Jackson - For One Who Knows
1998: Michael Moore Trio (with Fred Hersch and Mark Helias) – Bering (Ramboy)
1999: Joyce e Toninho Horta – Sem Você (DiscMedi Blau) 
2001: Ana Caram – Blue Bossa (Chesky)
2001: Ivan Lins - Jobiniando (Abril/EMI)
2001: Jaques Morelenbaum, Paula Morelenbaum, and Ryuichi Sakamoto - Morelenbaum²/Sakamoto: Casa (Universal/Sony)
2003: Cibelle, with Johnny Alf - Cibelle
2006: Ignacio Berroa - Codes
2006: Aaron Goldberg - Worlds
2007: Kurt Elling - Nightmoves
2007: Teresa Salgueiro & Septeto de João Cristal – Você e Eu (Capitol/EMI)
2008: Cristina Braga, Eugene Friesen – Paisagem (Biscoito Fino) 
2008: Milton Nascimento and Jobim Trio - Novas Bossas (EMI)
2008: Caetano Veloso - Roberto Carlos e Caetano Veloso e a Música de Tom Jobim (Amigo/Sony)
2010: Vinicius Cantuária - Samba Carioca
2010: Mark Murphy - Never Let Me Go
2010: Esperanza Spalding featuring Gretchen Parlato - Chamber Music Society
2012: Luciana Souza – Duos III (Sunnyside)
2012: Stéphane Spira - Round About Jobim
2013: Janis Siegel - Night Songs
2016: Carminho - Carminho Canta Tom Jobim

References

Bossa nova songs
Brazilian songs
Frank Sinatra songs
Portuguese-language songs
Songs with music by Antônio Carlos Jobim
Songs with lyrics by Ray Gilbert
Songs with lyrics by Aloísio de Oliveira